Qasr al-Hayr al-Sharqi is a castle (qasr) in the middle of the Syrian Desert. It was built by the Umayyad caliph Hisham ibn Abd al-Malik in 728-29 CE in an area rich in desert fauna. It was apparently used as a military and hunting outpost. The palace is the counterpart of Qasr al-Hayr al-Gharbi, a nearby castle palace built one year earlier. It is one of the so-called desert castles.

Location

Syrian Civil War
During Syria Civil War, Qasr al-Hayr al-Sharqi was captured by armed groups in 2013, then by ISIS. The Castle have been damaged by looting and vandalism. The visitor house has been burgled. The Syrian Army recaptured the castle on 22 August 2017.

Architecture
Like other Umayyad architectural works, the construction style was influenced by Byzantine and Sasanian architectures.

The palace consists of a large open courtyard surrounded by thick bulwarks and towers guarding the entrances as well as each corner. The palace(s) contains remnants of rooms, arches and columns which seem to be parts of a huge royal complex. Some of the decorated parts have been moved to the National Museum of Damascus while the gate has been reconstructed in the Deir ez-Zor Museum.

The bigger palace has been several floors, with a huge gate and many towers. Towers were not built as defensive measures. There were also olive yards. The palaces contained bathrooms, water reservoirs, mosques and gardens.

World Heritage Status
This site was added to the UNESCO World Heritage Tentative List on June 8, 1999, in the Cultural category.

Gallery

See also

Desert castles
List of castles in Syria

Notes

8th-century fortifications
Umayyad architecture in Jordan
Umayyad palaces
Umayyad architecture in Syria
Castles in Syria
Palaces in Syria
Buildings and structures in Homs Governorate
8th-century establishments in the Umayyad Caliphate
Buildings and structures completed in 729